Tartu Välk 494 may refer to:

 2003–2007 name of FC Santos Tartu, football club from Tartu, Estonia
 Another name for Tartu Kalev-Välk, ice hockey team from Tartu, Estonia